The 2010 NCAA Division I FCS football season, the 2010 season of college football for teams in the Football Championship Subdivision (FCS), began in September 2010 and concluded with the 2011 NCAA Division I Football Championship Game on January 7, 2011. In the title game, Eastern Washington defeated Delaware, 20–19, to claim their first Division I national title in any team sport.

For the first time since 1997, the final game was played at a new location—Pizza Hut Park in the Dallas suburb of Frisco, Texas. Every title game since 1997 had been held at Finley Stadium in Chattanooga, Tennessee, but the NCAA opened the hosting rights for the 2010–2012 championship games for bids during the 2009 season, as the hosting contract between the NCAA and the Chattanooga organizers was set to expire.
In addition to Frisco and Chattanooga, three other cities submitted bids:
 Little Rock, Arkansas — War Memorial Stadium
 Missoula, Montana — Washington–Grizzly Stadium
 Spokane, Washington — Joe Albi Stadium

The field of bidders was eventually cut to Chattanooga and Frisco, with Frisco being announced as the winner on February 26, 2010.

The January finish to the season was the result of an expanded playoff schedule. The championship tournament expanded from 16 teams to 20, with the Big South and Northeast Conference earning automatic bids for the first time. Eight teams played first-round games, with the remaining participants receiving byes into the second round. The playoffs began at their normal time on Thanksgiving weekend, specifically on November 27. According to early reports, the championship game would be played sometime between December 29 and January 7, with the latter date ultimately chosen.

Conference and program changes

New FCS programs
Two FCS programs began play in the 2010 season, and a third officially launched its program but chose not to compete until 2011:
Georgia State University fielded the first football team in its history. The Panthers play all home games at the Georgia Dome in Atlanta, with the upper decks being covered so that the fans are restricted to the lower tier of the 71,000+ capacity stadium. Coached by Bill Curry, a former FBS head coach, they participate in the Colonial Athletic Association, although they will not play a full conference schedule until 2012.
Lamar University revived its program after a 21-season absence. The Cardinals play their home games in Provost Umphrey Stadium, the same venue that hosted the Cardinals before their demise after the 1989 season but was extensively renovated for their FCS return. The Southland Conference members, coached by former NFL player Ray Woodard, did not play a full conference schedule until 2011.
UTSA officially began its football program during this season, however all of its players were redshirted so that the season could be used for practice only.

Conference changes

FCS team wins over FBS teams
 September 4 – Jacksonville State 49, Ole Miss 48 2OT
 September 4 – North Dakota State 6, Kansas 3
 September 11 – James Madison 21, No. 13 Virginia Tech 16
 This was only the second win by an FCS school over a ranked FBS team, after Appalachian State's historic win over Michigan in 2007.
 September 11 – Gardner–Webb 38, Akron 37 OT
 September 11 – Liberty 27, Ball State 23
 September 11 – South Dakota 41, Minnesota 38
 October 2 – UC Davis 14, San Jose State 13

Conference standings

Playoff qualifiers

Automatic berths for conference champions
Big Sky Conference – Montana State
Big South Conference – Coastal Carolina
Colonial Athletic Association – William & Mary
Missouri Valley Football Conference – Northern Iowa
Mid-Eastern Athletic Conference – Bethune–Cookman
Northeast Conference – Robert Morris
Ohio Valley Conference – Southeast Missouri State
Patriot League – Lehigh
Southern Conference – Appalachian State
Southland Conference – Stephen F. Austin

At large qualifiers
Big Sky Conference – Eastern Washington
Colonial Athletic Association – Delaware
Colonial Athletic Association – New Hampshire
Colonial Athletic Association – Villanova
Mid-Eastern Athletic Conference – South Carolina State
Missouri Valley Football Conference – North Dakota State
Missouri Valley Football Conference – Western Illinois
Ohio Valley Conference – Jacksonville State
Southern Conference – Georgia Southern
Southern Conference – Wofford

No teams from the conferences that do not have automatic bids—currently the Great West Conference and Pioneer Football League—received bids. In order for a team from a conference without an automatic bid to be eligible for the playoffs, it must have a minimum of seven Division I wins, with at least two against teams in automatic bid conferences. The team in question also must be ranked an average of 16 or better in the national rankings.

Abstains
Ivy League – Pennsylvania
Southwestern Athletic Conference – Texas Southern

 (Overall Record, Conference Record)

Postseason
After 24 seasons with a playoff field of sixteen teams, the FCS bracket was expanded to twenty this postseason, with the five seeded teams and seven others receiving first-round byes.  The championship game was moved to January, three weeks after the mid-December semifinals.

The FCS playoff field was twenty for three seasons, then expanded to 24 in 2013.

NCAA Division I playoff bracket

*

SWAC Championship Game

Global Kilimanjaro Bowl

On September 1, 2010, Drake University announced it would participate in the Global Kilimanjaro Bowl, the first American football game played on the continent of Africa. The game featured the Drake Bulldogs versus Mexican All-Star team CONADEIP. Due to the seasonal difference in Africa, the Global Kilimanjaro Bowl was played on May 21, 2011.

Final poll standings

Standings are from The Sports Network final poll.

Standings are from the FCS Coaches final poll.

References

External links